Belpre Township is one of the twenty-two townships of Washington County, Ohio, United States.  The 2000 census found 4,192 people in the township.

Geography
Located in the southwestern part of the county along the Ohio River, it borders the following townships:
Dunham Township - north
Troy Township, Athens County - southwest
Decatur Township - west

Wood County, West Virginia lies across the Ohio River to the southeast.

Two populated places are located in Belpre Township along the Ohio River: The city of Belpre, in the southeast; and the unincorporated community of Little Hocking, in the southwest.

Name and history
With a name derived from the French for "beautiful meadow", it is the only Belpre Township statewide.

Government
The township is governed by a three-member board of trustees, who are elected in November of odd-numbered years to a four-year term beginning on the following January 1. Two are elected in the year after the presidential election and one is elected in the year before it. There is also an elected township fiscal officer, who serves a four-year term beginning on April 1 of the year after the election, which is held in November of the year before the presidential election. Vacancies in the fiscal officership or on the board of trustees are filled by the remaining trustees.

References

External links
County website

Townships in Washington County, Ohio
Townships in Ohio